Nürnberger Flugdienst Flight 108 was a scheduled regional flight which crashed near Essen, Germany, on 8 February 1988 with the loss of all 21 occupants. The flight was operated by Swearingen SA.227BC Metroliner III D-CABB for Nürnberger Flugdienst, from Hannover Airport to Düsseldorf Airport. It is the deadliest aviation accident involving the Swearingen Fairchild Metroliner.

Accident
Flight 108 took off from Hannover Airport at 7:15am and was on approach to runway 24 at Düsseldorf Airport by 7:50am, in a thunderstorm. The Captain of the flight was Ralf Borsdorf, 36, and the First Officer was Sibylle Heilmann, 29. At 7:56am both flight recorders abruptly stopped recording and the aircraft disappeared from secondary radar. Two minutes later, pieces of the Metro III impacted near Kettwig adjacent to the Ruhr River, killing all 21 people aboard.

Investigation
The investigation revealed that the aircraft had been hit by lightning during the approach to Düsseldorf Airport, which disrupted the electrical system and therefore the flight instruments. The pilots became disorientated and blindly entered a high speed descent. Witnesses on the ground described the plane as coming out of the clouds briefly and entering a climb, which suggested that the crew briefly regained orientation of the aircraft upon seeing the ground. However, once it re-entered the clouds the crew likely became disoriented again. After almost 2 minutes of "predominantly uncontrolled flight," one of the trailing edge flaps (which could not be retracted without electrical power) failed due to overloading, sending the aircraft into an unrecoverable spiral during which it disintegrated in midair.

References 

Aviation accidents and incidents in 1988
Aviation accidents and incidents in Germany
1988 in aviation
1988 in Germany
Accidents and incidents involving the Fairchild Swearingen Metroliner
February 1988 events in Europe
Airliner accidents and incidents caused by lightning strikes
1988 disasters in Germany